To Quebec and the Stars is a collection of seventeen essays written by H. P. Lovecraft, assembled and edited by L. Sprague de Camp, who came across them in the course of his research for his biography of Lovecraft. The collection was first published in hardcover by Donald M. Grant, Publisher, Inc. in 1976.

Summary
The essays collected in the book cover a variety of subjects, notably astronomy, poetry, literature and travel; the main piece is a travelogue to Quebec, published for the first time in this collection.

Essays
"Trans-Neptunian Planets"
"November Skies"
"June Skies"
"May Skies"
"The Truth About Mars"
"Metrical Regularity"
"Allowable Rhyme"
"A Reminiscence of Dr. Samuel Johnson"
"The Literature of Rome"
"What Belongs in Verse"
"The Crime of the Century"
"Nietzscheism and Realism"
"A Confession of Unfaith"
"A Descent to Avernus"
"Some Dutch Footprints in New England"
"The Unknown City in the Ocean"
"A Description of the Town of Quebec"

Reception
Richard A. Lupoff praised the collection as "an absolute treasure trove," singling out the title piece as "a delight to read ... like taking a guided tour of the city in the company of a knowledgeable and garrulous friend whose greatest delight is to share with you his own pleasure in the city and its past."

Notes

1976 non-fiction books
Non-fiction books by H. P. Lovecraft
Books by L. Sprague de Camp
Essay collections
Culture of Quebec City
Essays by H. P. Lovecraft
Donald M. Grant, Publisher books